MAIB is an acronym which may refer to:

Marine Accident Investigation Branch, United Kingdom
Movement for the Self-Determination of Bioko Island (Movimiento para la Auto-determinación de la Isla de Bioko), Equatorial Guinea
Moldova Agroindbank, Republic of Moldova